Ponghoz or Pangaz is a village and jamoat in north-west Tajikistan. It is located in Asht District in Sughd Region. The jamoat has a total population of 28,352 (2015). It consists of 7 villages, including Ponghoz (the seat) and Bobodarkhon.

Notes

References

Populated places in Sughd Region
Jamoats of Tajikistan